Boris Palu (born 4 February 1996) is a French professional rugby union player. He currently plays at lock for Racing 92 in the Top 14.

Personal life
Palu was born in France to a French father and Cameroonian mother, and spent his early childhood in Africa.

References

External links
 Racing 92 profile

1996 births
Living people
Rugby union players from Toulouse
French rugby union players
France international rugby union players
French sportspeople of Cameroonian descent
Rugby union locks
Racing 92 players